Pratik Sargade (born 12 October 1989) is an Indian cricketer. He made his Twenty20 debut for Puducherry in the 2018–19 Syed Mushtaq Ali Trophy on 22 February 2019.

References

External links
 

1989 births
Living people
Indian cricketers
Pondicherry cricketers
Place of birth missing (living people)